The East Texas Negro League, also referred to as the Negro East Texas League, was a Negro league baseball league that operated for one season in 1946. The league fielded 11 teams in Louisiana and Texas.

List of teams (in alphabetical order)
Cuney All Stars (1946)
Gilmer (1946)
Henderson (1946)
Jacksonville (1946)
Longview (1946)
Marshall (1946)
Paris Brown Sox (1946)
Sherman Bearcats (1946)
Shreveport Black Sports (1946)
Texarkana (1946)
Tyler (1946)

See also
Negro league baseball

References

External links
Center for Negro League Research

Defunct minor baseball leagues in the United States
Negro baseball leagues
Baseball leagues in Louisiana
Baseball leagues in Texas
Sports leagues established in 1951
1951 establishments in Texas
African-American history of Texas
African-American history of Louisiana